The Type 518 radar is a Chinese high-performance L band long-range shipboard air surveillance radar. The Type 518 radar may be installed on destroyers or heavy tonnage naval vessels to detect long-range high-altitude aircraft in adverse natural noise and active electronic jamming environments.

The Type 518 has been installed and deployed on the Luhu-class destroyer and the Type 052D destroyer.

It is manufactured and exported by the Nanjing Changjiang Machinery Group Co Ltd (南京长江机器集团电子装备有限公司).

Specifications
 L - band
 Wide frequency band, pulse-to-pulse frequency jump
 4 phase code pulse compression technology
 Low sidelobe super cosecant squared antenna
 Counter electronic countermeasure and noise suppression capability
 Adaptive MTI filters for noise map and speed map are provided.
 Interference analysis and selected transmission technology
 Other reported names:
 REL-2 (export, company)
 Hai Ying

See also
 Type 052 Luhu class destroyer

External links
 Nanjing Changjiang Machinery Group Co Ltd  

Sea radars
Military radars of the People's Republic of China